Borodkin (from бородка meaning small beard) is a Russian masculine surname, its feminine counterpart is Borodkina. It may refer to:

 Aleksandr Borodkin (born 1971), Russian football player and coach
 Artyom Borodkin (born 1991), Russian ice hockey defenceman
 Mikhail Borodkin (1852–1919), Russian general, military lawyer and historian

Russian-language surnames